Flying High or Flyin' High may refer to:

Film, television and theatre 
 Flying High (musical), a 1930 Broadway musical
 Flying High (1926 film), an American silent film directed by Charles Hutchison
 Flying High (1931 film), an MGM adaptation of the Broadway musical, produced by George White
 Flying High! or Airplane!, a 1980 satirical comedy film
 Flying High (TV series), a 1978–1979 American comedy-drama series

Music

Albums 
 Flyin' High (album), a 1976 album by Blackfoot
 Flying High (album), a 1992 album by The Irresistible Force
 Flying High, a 2009 album by Ali Campbell

Songs 
 "Flying High" (Captain Hollywood Project song), 1994
 "Flying High" (Chipmunk song), 2010
 "Flying High" (Country Joe and the Fish song), 1967
 "Flying High" (Jem), 2004
 "Flying High" (Freeez song), 1981
 "Flying High" (Commodores song), a 1978 song by the Commodores from Natural High
 "Flyin' High (In the Friendly Sky)", a 1971 song by Marvin Gaye
 "Flyin' High", a song by Krokus from Heart Attack
 "Flying High", a song by Band-Maid from Conqueror
 "Flying High", a song by Travis Scott from Rodeo

Other uses 
 Flying High Bird Sanctuary, Queensland, Australia

See also 
 Fly High (disambiguation)